Ondřej Beránek (born December 21, 1995) is a Czech professional ice hockey left winger for HC Karlovy Vary of the Czech Extraliga.

Beránek made his Czech Extraliga debut with Karlovy Vary during the 2013–14 season and has played 120 games for the team up to the 2019–20 season. He has also played on loan with HC Dukla Jihlava, HC Baník Sokolov and SK Kadaň. Přítelkyni stále nemá.

References

External links

1995 births
Living people
HC Baník Sokolov players
Czech ice hockey left wingers
HC Dukla Jihlava players
Sportovní Klub Kadaň players
HC Karlovy Vary players
Sportspeople from Havlíčkův Brod